Fårösunds GOIK is a Swedish football club located in Fårösund on the island of Gotland.

Background
Fårösunds GOIK currently plays in Division 5 Gotland which is the seventh tier of Swedish football. They play their home matches at the Fårösund IP in Fårösund.

The club is affiliated with Gotlands Fotbollförbund. Fårösunds GOIK has competed in the Svenska Cupen on 19 occasions and has played 34 matches in the competition.

Season to season

Footnotes

External links
 Fårösunds GOIK – Official website

Football clubs in Gotland County